Umland is a surname. Notable people with the surname include:

Andreas Umland (born 1967), German political scientist, historian, and interpreter
Jeffrey Umland, American mechanical engineer
Kristin Umland, American mathematician and mathematics educator